Adrian Georgyevich Puzanovsky (born 3 January 1942), is a Russian politician who was a member of the first, second and third convocations of the State Duma from 1993 to 2003.

Biography

Adrian Puzanovsky was born on 3 January 1942 in the Edineț District of the Moldavian Soviet Socialist Republic (now the Republic of Moldova), to his father, Georgy Yakovlevich, and to his mother, Anna Denisovna Puzanovskaya (Pchelkina).

In 1965, he graduated from the Chișinău State University named after V. I. Lenin. He is a doctor of economic sciences, and a professor. He was engaged in teaching activities.

From 1993, Puzanovsky was a member of the first, second and third convocations of the State Duma from the Kostroma single-mandate constituency. In the first convocation he was elected from the Dignity and Charity bloc, in the second convocation - from the Agrarian Party, in the third he was a member of the People's Deputy group.

Family

Puzanovsky is married to Margarita Semyonovna Puzanovskaya (born in 1947). They have two children, son Aleksandr and daughter Valeria, and grandchildren, Anfisa, Yevgeny, and Konstantin.

References

1942 births
Living people
People from Edineț District
Moldova State University alumni
First convocation members of the State Duma (Russian Federation)
Second convocation members of the State Duma (Russian Federation)
Third convocation members of the State Duma (Russian Federation)